Gustav Hugo (23 November 1764 – 15 September 1844) was a German jurist.

Biography
Hugo was born at Lörrach in Baden. From the gymnasium at Karlsruhe he passed in 1782 to the University of Göttingen, where he studied law for three years. Having received the appointment of tutor to the prince of Anhalt-Dessau, he took his doctor's degree at the University of Halle in 1788. Recalled in the same year to Göttingen as extraordinary professor of law, he became a full professor in 1792. In the preface to his Beiträge zur civilistischen Bucherkenntniss der letzten vierzig Jahre (1828–1829) he gives a sketch of the condition of the civil law teaching at Göttingen at that time.

The Roman and German elements of the existing law were, without criticism or differentiation, welded into an ostensible whole for practical needs, with the result that it was difficult to say whether historical truth or practical ends were most prejudiced. As it was passed from person to person, new errors crept in, and even the best of teachers could not escape from the false method which had become traditional. These were the evils which Hugo set himself to combat, and he became the founder of the German Historical School of jurisprudence which was continued and further developed by Savigny. His magna opera are the Lehrbuch eines civilistischen Cursus (7 vols., 1792–1821), in which his method is thoroughly worked out, and Civilistisches Magazin (6 vols., 1790–1837).

Hugo was criticized, and ridiculed, by Karl Marx in the Rheinische Zeitung for justifying the "law of arbitrary power", that is, for endorsing societal injustice and exploitation simply because the institutions which generate them exist.

Publications 
Major publications of Gustav Hugo include:

References 

 
 Gabor Hamza, "Entstehung und Entwicklung der modernen Privatrechtsordnungen und die römischrechtliche Tradition" (Budapest, 2009) pp. 189–192.
 

1764 births
1844 deaths
People from Lörrach
Jurists from Baden-Württemberg
University of Göttingen alumni
University of Halle alumni
Academic staff of the University of Göttingen